The Old White Bear is a pub at 1 Well Road, Hampstead, in the London Borough of Camden.

It dates back to 1704, but closed on 2 February 2014, as the property developer Braaid Ventures Ltd tried to obtain a change of use application to turn it into a six-bedroom luxury house. Camden Council rejected this, and it was set to reopen as a pub eight months later, following community protests and a petition signed by 4,000 people and supported by the actors Ricky Gervais and Peter Egan. The pub reopened on 15 December 2021.

References

External links

Buildings and structures in Hampstead
Commercial buildings completed in 1704
Pubs in the London Borough of Camden
1704 establishments in England